After Red Army invasion of Azerbaijan began repressions of the Bolsheviks against the Azerbaijani military officers. The participation of Azerbaijani  military officers in the Ganja revolt accelerated this process. The second wave began during Great Purge.

List

References

Azerbaijani military leaders
Death in the Soviet Union
Ethnic groups in the Soviet Union
 
Lists of Azerbaijani people
Political and cultural purges
Politics of the Soviet Union
Political repression in the Soviet Union
Persecution by the Soviet Union
1930s in the Soviet Union
1936 in the Soviet Union
1937 in the Soviet Union
1938 in the Soviet Union
20th century in Azerbaijan